Argentina has the 14th most diplomatic missions of any country in the world, including 88 of the 193 members states of the United Nations (UN), as well as observer states Palestine and Vatican City and non-member country of Taiwan. This list excludes honorary consulates.

Current missions

Africa

Americas

Asia

Europe

Oceania

Multilateral organizations

Gallery

Closed missions

Africa

Americas

Asia

Europe

See also

List of diplomatic missions in Argentina
Foreign relations of Argentina
Visa policy of Argentina

Notes

References

 
Diplomatic missions
Argentina